Typha caspica is a plant species native to Republic of Azerbaijan between Russia and Iran. The species grows in freshwater marshes.

References

caspica
Freshwater plants
Flora of Azerbaijan
Plants described in 1950